This is a list of lighthouses in Latvia. They mark the western coast of the country, which includes parts of the Baltic Sea, the Gulf of Riga, and the Irbe Strait which connects the gulf to the Baltic. 
Latvian lighthouses date from the Russian Imperial period, and some of the newer ones are built during Soviet period. 

Lighthouses in Latvia are monitored and regulated by the Latvian Maritime Administration and are operated by the local port authorities of Liepāja, Ventspils and Rīga. Some are classified as Latvian Cultural Property of National Importance.

Lighthouses

See also
 Lists of lighthouses and lightvessels
 List of tallest buildings in Latvia

References

External links

 

Latvia
Lighthouse
Lighthouses